The Longest Yard: The Soundtrack is the original soundtrack to Peter Segal's 2005 film The Longest Yard. It was released on May 24, 2005 through Derrty Ent. Records and Universal Records and consisted entirely of hip hop music. The soundtrack was a success, peaking at #11 on the Billboard 200, #10 on the Top R&B/Hip-Hop Albums and #1 on the Top Soundtracks.  On December 30, 2005 the soundtrack was certified platinum for selling 1,003,500 copies in the U.S.

Two singles also made it to the Billboard charts, "Errtime" and "Fly Away", both performed by Nelly, who also plays Earl Megget in the film.

Track listing 

Notes
  signifies an additional producer.

References

External links 

2005 soundtrack albums
Sports film soundtracks
Hip hop soundtracks
Universal Records soundtracks
Albums produced by Eminem
Albums produced by Jazze Pha
Albums produced by David Banner
Albums produced by Erick Sermon
Comedy-drama film soundtracks